Phi Delta Pi  was a national professional fraternity for women in the disciplines of health and physical education, health sciences, and recreation.

History

Phi Delta Pi was one of the eleven women's professional fraternities to found the Professional Panhellenic Association in 1925.

Many of its early chapters were placed at vocational-oriented Normal Schools for Physical Education which did not survive the Great Depression.  Later chapters were placed at colleges with broader course offerings and stronger financial footing. Baird's reports there were fourteen active chapters and sixteen inactive chapters in 1967, but provides only twenty chapter names in the 20th Edition of that resource.

Chapters
The chapters of Phi Delta Pi were as follows; this list may be incomplete, and some chapters here listed as inactive may have merged or been absorbed only as alumni clubs (no active chapters).  Chapters known to be active at the time of merger in bold, inactive chapters in italics.

Membership
Four types of membership existed in Phi Delta Pi:

Active
Alumni
Honorary
Special Membership

Notable Honorary Members
Notable Honorary Members include:

 Maud May Babcock - Salt Lake City, pioneer leader in physical education in the State of Utah. 
 Lillian Schoedler, former secretary of the Women's Division of the NAAF. 
 Jane Deeter Rippin, past National Director of the Girl Scouts of the United States of America. 
 Grace E. Jones, Summit, New Jersey, Supervisor of Health and Physical Education , Summit, N. J. 
 Helen E. Manley, University City, Missouri , Director of Health and Physical Education , University City, Mo. President of the American Association for Health , Phy sical Education , and Recreation , 
 Anne Schley Duggan , Denton, Texas , Director of Health and Physical Education , Texas State College for Women , Denton, Texas.

References

Fraternities and sororities in the United States
Professional fraternities and sororities in the United States
Student organizations established in 1916
1916 establishments in Indiana
Defunct fraternities and sororities
Former members of Professional Fraternity Association